Soulages may refer to:
Pierre Soulages (1919–2022), French painter, engraver and sculptor
Soulages, Cantal, a commune in the Cantal department in France
Soulages-Bonneval, a commune in the Aveyron department in France

See also
Soulage